Abbotsbury was the terminus of the Abbotsbury branch railway in the west of the English county of Dorset. Serving the village of Abbotsbury, it was sited across the fields a mile from the village on the Weymouth to Abbotsbury road, because the railway could not buy the land needed to build the station nearer to the village. Plans for westward expansion came to nothing and led to the railway petering out in a shallow cutting to the west of the station.

History

Opened by the Abbotsbury Railway Company in 1885, it was operated from the start by the Great Western Railway. The line then passed on to the Western Region of British Railways on nationalisation in 1948.

Buildings

A typical William Clarke stone building served the single platform. The station also had a signal box and engine shed, and although neither of these operated for long, the ruins of the engine shed remained until closure. The goods shed however functioned for the life of the branch.

The station closed with the branch in 1952.

The site today

The station building has now been replaced with a private dwelling although the platform remains underneath the length of the building.

Film

The station makes short appearances in the Powell and Pressburger film The Small Back Room.

References 

 Abbotsbury station on navigable 1946 O. S. map

Further reading 

 
 

Disused railway stations in Dorset
Former Great Western Railway stations
Railway stations in Great Britain opened in 1885
Railway stations in Great Britain closed in 1952